The 1941 Tulane Green Wave football team was an American football team that represented Tulane University in the Southeastern Conference (SEC) during the 1941 college football season. Led by Red Dawson in his sixth and final year as head coach, the Green Wave played their home games at Tulane Stadium in New Orleans. Tulane finished the season with an overall record of 5–5 and a mark of 2–3 in conference play, placing eighth in the SEC. The Green Wave was outscored by opponents by a total of 220 to 95.

Schedule

References

Tulane
Tulane Green Wave football seasons
Tulane Green Wave football